Passer is a genus of sparrows, also known as the true sparrows. The genus contains 28 species and includes the house sparrow and the Eurasian tree sparrow, two of the most common birds in the world. They are small birds with thick bills for eating seeds, and are mostly coloured grey or brown. Native to the Old World, some species have been introduced throughout the world.

Taxonomy
The genus Passer was introduced by the French zoologist Mathurin Jacques Brisson in 1760. The type species was subsequently designated as the house sparrow (Passer domesticus). The name Passer is the Latin word for "sparrow."

Studies by Arnaiz-Villena et al. have examined the evolutionary relationships of the genus Passer with other members of the family Passeridae, and of members of the genus in relation to each other. According to a study by Arnaiz Villena et al. published in 2001, the genus originated in Africa and the Cape sparrow is the most basal lineage. The particular lineages within the genus, such as the house sparrow and other Palaearctic black-bibbed sparrows, likely originate from radiations from southern and western Africa.

Species 
The genus contains 28 species:

Besides these living species, there are questionable fossils from as long ago as the Early Miocene, and Passer predomesticus, from the Middle Pleistocene.

Description 

These sparrows are plump little brown or greyish birds, often with black, yellow or white markings. They have strong, stubby conical beaks with decurved culmens and blunter tips. All species have calls similar to the house sparrow's chirrup or tschilp call, and some, though not the house sparrow, have elaborate songs.

Distribution 

Most of its members are found naturally in open habitats in the warmer climates of Africa and southern Eurasia. Evolutionary studies suggest the genus originated in Africa. Several species have adapted to human habitation, and this has enabled the house sparrow in particular, in close association with humans, to extend its Eurasian range well beyond what was probably its original home in the Middle East. Apart from this natural colonisation, the house sparrow has been introduced to many parts of the world outside its natural range, including the Americas, sub-Saharan Africa, and Australia. The Eurasian tree sparrow has also been artificially introduced on a smaller scale, with populations in Australia and locally in Missouri and Illinois in the United States.

Behaviour 

Passer sparrows build an untidy nest, which, depending on species and nest site availability, may be in a bush or tree, a natural hole in a tree, in a building or in thatch, or in the fabric of the nest of species such as the white stork. The clutch of up to eight eggs is incubated by both parents typically for 12–14 days, with another 14–24 more days to fledging.

Passer sparrows are primarily ground-feeding seed-eaters, though they also consume small insects especially when breeding. A few species, like the house sparrow and northern grey-headed sparrow scavenge for food around cities, and are almost omnivorous. Most Passer species are gregarious and will form substantial flocks.

References 

Works cited

External links 

Passeridae on the Internet Bird Collection
 

 
Passeridae
Bird genera